Dennis Dutko (1943–1990) was a member of the Michigan House of Representatives from 1974–1989. He was arrested on drunk driving charges four times while in office, the first time was in 1979.  In 1989, he was sent to jail for seven months and resigned from the state House.  In January 1990, he was arrested in Tennessee on charges of drug possession and driving without a licence.  He committed suicide five days later at a Florida condominium.

References

Sources
Detroit Free Press, August 2, 2009, p. 6A

1943 births
Members of the Michigan House of Representatives
1990 deaths
20th-century American politicians